Jared Bridgeman, (born May 3, 1974) better known by his stage name Akrobatik, is an American rapper from the Dorchester neighborhood of Boston, Massachusetts. He is also a part of the hip hop collective named The Perceptionists with Mr. Lif and DJ Fakts One, which released Black Dialogue in 2005.

Career 
In 1998, Akrobatik released his first single, "Ruff Enough", on Boston's Detonator Records label. It was followed by "Internet MCs" and "Say Yes Say Word".

His music has appeared on television series such as HBO's The Wire and ESPN's Playmakers, in films such as Date Movie and Wholetrain, and in video games such as NBA Live '06, Amplitude, Frequency, EA Sports UFC, and Need for Speed: Most Wanted.

In 2003, Akrobatik released an album, Balance, on Coup D'état. It ranked at number 4 on CMJ's "Hip-Hop 2003" chart.

In December 2005, Akrobatik signed to Fat Beats Records. The Brooklyn-based label released his second studio album, Absolute Value, in 2008. It received positive reviews from AllMusic, HipHopDX, Okayplayer, and PopMatters.

In 2011, Akrobatik suffered a ruptured heart valve and was rushed to Massachusetts General Hospital, where he underwent an emergency valve replacement surgery. In 2014, he released an album, Built to Last, which was listed by Spin as one of the 40 best hip-hop albums of the year.

Discography

Studio albums 
 Balance (2003)
 Absolute Value (2008)
 Built to Last (2014)

Compilation albums 
 Detonator Records Vol.1 Compilation (2002) 
 The Lost Adats (2003)
 Essential Akrobatik, Vol. 1 (2007)

EPs 
 The EP (2002)

Singles 
 "Ruff Enuff" b/w "Woman" (1998)
 "Say Yes Say Word" (1999)
 "Internet MCs" (2000)
 "U Got It" (2001)
 ”Hypocrite" b/w "Strictly for the DJ's" (2002)
 "Remind My Soul" (2003)
 "A to the K" b/w "Beast Mode" (2006)
 "Put Ya Stamp on It" (2008)
 "Alive" (2012)
 "Adapt and Prosper" (2017)
 "Verbal Assault" (2017)

Guests appearances 
 Mr. Lif – "Avengers" from Enter the Colossus (2000)
 7L & Esoteric – "State of the Art" from The Soul Purpose (2001)
 Mr. Lif – "Intro (Missing Person's File)" from Emergency Rations (2002)
 Mr. Lif – "Post Mortem" from I Phantom (2002)
 Push Button Objects – "Fly" from Ghetto Blaster (2003)
 Raw Produce – "Rick Cerrone" from The Feeling of Now (2004)
 Mr. Lif – "Mo' Mega" from Mo' Mega (2006)
 The Mighty Underdogs – "Escape" from Droppin' Science Fiction (2008)
 Effect – "Crush the Competition" from Fine Tuned Tantrum (2008)
 Fabio Musta – "I Still Want More" from Passport (2009)
 Virtuoso – "No Fear" from The Final Conflict (2011)
 Mister Jason – "Mister Jason Has a Posse" (2011)
 Snowgoons – "The Real Talk" from Black Snow 2 (2013)
 DJ Nefarious – "Classic Mindset" from Classic Mindset (2014)
 Golden Brown Sound – "Fight" from Great Man Theory (2014)
 N.B.S. – "We on That" from Budavets (2014)
 Thoughtsarizen – "Trippin (Kelly Dean Remix)" from Traveling Dragon Man (2015)
 Reks – "Plane Gang" from The Greatest X (2016)
 Ripshop & Reel Drama – "Real as They Come" from Regime Change (2016)
 L'Orange & Mr. Lif – "The Scribe" and "Strange Technology" from The Life & Death of Scenery (2016)
 The Funk Junkie – "Touch the Ground" from Moondirt (2017)
 Ben Shorr – "Over The Bullshit" from Pyrokinesis (2017)
 Craig G - "Wake up Dead" from The 20/20 Ep (2020)

References

External links

 
 

African-American male rappers
American male rappers
Living people
Rappers from Boston
East Coast hip hop musicians
20th-century American rappers
21st-century American rappers
20th-century American male musicians
21st-century American male musicians
Year of birth missing (living people)
20th-century African-American musicians
21st-century African-American musicians
Rappers from Massachusetts